The 2018 Washington House of Representatives elections took place as part of the biennial United States elections. Washington state voters elected state representatives in all 98 seats of the House, electing 2 state representatives in each of the 49 Washington state legislative districts. State representatives serve two-year terms in the Washington House of Representatives. A statewide map of Washington's state legislative districts is provided by the Washington State Legislature here, .

A top two primary election on August 7, 2018, determined which candidates appeared on the November 6 general election ballot. Each candidate is allowed to write in their party preference so that it appears as they desire on the ballot.

Democrats increased their 50–48 majority in the 2016 elections by flipping seven seats to hold 57 seats to Republicans' 41.

Only three districts, the 10th, 19th, and 42nd, elected their two representatives from different parties.

Overview

Summary of results by State House district

Detailed Primary & General Election Results by House District

District 1
Position 1

Position 2

District 2
Position 1

Position 2

District 3
Position 1

Position 2

District 4
Position 1

Position 2

District 5
Position 1

Position 2

District 6
Position 1

Position 2

District 7
Position 1

Position 2

District 8
Position 1

Position 2

District 9
Position 1

Position 2

District 10
Position 1

Position 2

District 11
Position 1

Position 2

District 12
Position 1

Position 2

District 13
Position 1

Position 2

District 14
Position 1

Position 2

District 15
Position 1

Position 2

District 16
Position 1

Position 2

District 17
Position 1

Position 2

District 18
Position 1

Position 2

District 19
Position 1

Position 2

District 20
Position 1

Position 2

District 21
Position 1

Position 2

District 22
Position 1

Position 2

District 23
Position 1

Position 2

District 24
Position 1

Position 2

District 25
Position 1

Position 2

District 26
Position 1

Position 2

District 27
Position 1

Position 2

District 28
Position 1

Position 2

District 29
Position 1

Position 2

District 30
Position 1

Position 2

District 31
Position 1

Position 2

District 32
Position 1

Position 2

District 33
Position 1

Position 2

District 34
Position 1

Position 2

District 35
Position 1

Position 2

District 36
Position 1

Position 2

District 37
Position 1

Position 2

District 38
Position 1

Position 2

District 39
Position 1

Position 2

District 40
Position 1

Position 2

District 41
Position 1

Position 2

District 42
Position 1

Position 2

District 43
Position 1

Position 2

District 44
Position 1

Position 2

District 45
Position 1

Position 2

District 46
Position 1

Position 2

District 47
Position 1

Position 2

District 48
Position 1

Position 2

District 49
Position 1

Position 2

See also
 United States elections, 2018
 United States House of Representatives elections in Washington, 2018
 United States Senate election in Washington, 2018
 Washington State Senate election, 2018

References

Washington House of Representatives elections
2018 Washington (state) elections
Washington House of Representatives